Dominie Pittman (born October 13, 1986) is a defensive end who is currently a free agent. He has also played for the BC Lions of the Canadian Football League. Pittman signed as a free agent with the Lions on April 22, 2010. He played college football for the North Alabama Lions.

On June 6, 2015, Pittman was traded by the Los Angeles KISS to the New Orleans VooDoo to complete the trade of Rayshaun Kizer.

On January 28, 2016, Pittman was assigned to the Tampa Bay Storm.

References

1986 births
Living people
African-American players of Canadian football
American players of Canadian football
North Alabama Lions football players
BC Lions players
Canadian football defensive linemen
Players of Canadian football from Pensacola, Florida
Pittsburgh Power players
African-American players of American football
Players of American football from Pensacola, Florida
Los Angeles Kiss players
New Orleans VooDoo players
Tampa Bay Storm players